Hjelledalstind is a mountain in Årdal Municipality in Vestland county, Norway, in the Jotunheimen mountain range. It was first climbed in 1884 by Carl Hall and Mathias Soggemoen.

References

Årdal
Mountains of Vestland
One-thousanders of Norway